Alexander Oleinik (born March 8, 1986) is a Ukrainian professional Kickboxing and Muay Thai fighter who competes in the middleweight, light heavyweight and cruiserweight divisions.
He has begun practicing Kyokushin Karate in early childhood at the age of six. Shortly he became a Ukrainian champion in the youth division. At the age of 17 he started practicing Muay Thai.

He first came to prominence due to his successful amateur career by winning IFMA European and World Championships in 2010. At that time he simultaneously combined his amateur and professional careers.
He turned professional in 2007 by winning his debut fight in Brezno, Slovakia. Two years later he became ISKA World Champion in professional division. In 2010 Alexander won King of Kings World Grand Prix -83 kg in Chișinău, Moldova.  He continued his professional record through 2011 where he won the 2011 Tatneft World Cup in division under 80 kg.

As of January 2012, he is ranked the #2 light heavyweight kickboxer in the world by Liverkick.com. He has proved it with wins over four top 10 fighters in Sem Braan, Constantin Țuțu, Alexander Stetsurenko and Dmitry Shakuta.

Career

Professional record

Professional debut: July 7, 2007 (Brezno, Slovakia)

51 fights, 44 won, 16 KOs, 7 lost

 2017 – ISKA Pro-Am World Champion – 88,5 kg – Singen, Germany
 2017 – KOK World Grand Prix Winner – 85 kg – Tallinn, Estonia
 2011 – Tatneft Cup Champion – -80 kg – Kazan, Russia
 2010 – KOK World Grand Prix in K-1 Winner  – 83 kg – Chisinau, Moldova
 2009 – World champion in professional kickboxing K-1 – Hurghada, Egypt

Amateur career
The ninefold world champion on kickboxing and muay thai among amateurs under versions WAKO, IFMA and ISKA. 
 World champion in K-1 and Low-kick (Kyiv, Ukraine, 2018 - ISKA) 
 World champion in Muay-thai (Athens, Greece, 2017 – ISKA) 
 World champion in K-1 (Athens, Greece, 2017 – ISKA) 
 World champion in Muay-thai (Bangkok, Thailand, 2010 – IFMA) 
 European Champion in Muay-thai (Rome, Italy, 2010 – IFMA) 
 European Championship in Muay-thai (Antalya, Turkey, 2012 – IFMA) – 2nd place 
 World Championship in Muay-thai (Bangkok, Thailand, 2009; Tashkent, Uzbekistan, 2011, Saint-Petersbourgh, Russia, 2012 – IFMA) – 3rd place 
 European Championship in Muay-thai (Antalya, Turkey, 2011 – IFMA) – 3rd place 
 World Cup winner in Muay-thai (Yalta, Ukraine, 2008 – WAKO) 
 World Cup winner in Muay-thai (Yalta, Ukraine, 2009 – WAKO) 
 World Cup winner in Kickboxing (Yalta, Ukraine, 2008 – WAKO) 
 Champion of Ukraine in Muay-thai (14 gold medals, IFMA) 
 Champion of Ukraine in Kickboxing (7 gold medals, WAKO, ISKA)

Fight record

|-  bgcolor="#FFBBBB"
| 2017-12-15 || Loss ||align=left|  Wei Zhou || King of Kung-fu World Championship || Qian'an, China || Judge decision || 6 || K-1
|-
|-  bgcolor="#CCFFCC"
| 2017-12-12 || Win ||align=left|  Vanderlei Goncalves Dos Santos || King of Kung-fu World Championship || Qian'an, China || Judge decision || 3 || K-1
|-
|-  bgcolor="#CCFFCC"
| 2017-12-07 || Win ||align=left| Laononkro Anurak || King of Kung-fu World Championship || Qian'an, China || Judge decision || 3 || K-1
|-
! style=background:white colspan=9 |
|-
|-  bgcolor="#CCFFCC"
| 2017-11-04 || Win ||align=left|  Selahattin Sahin || TBC Singen Fight Night || Singen, Germany || Judge decision || 5 || K-1
|-
! style=background:white colspan=9 |
|-
|-  bgcolor="#CCFFCC"
| 2017-10-14 || Win ||align=left|  Petros Vardakas || King of Kings 49 Final || Tallinn, Estonia || Judge decision || 3 || K-1
|-
|-  bgcolor="#CCFFCC"
| 2017-10-14 || Win ||align=left|  Pavel Turuk || King of Kings 49 Semifinal || Tallinn, Estonia || Judge decision || 3 || K-1
|-
|-  bgcolor="#FFBBBB"
| 2017-04-28 || Loss ||align=left|  Vasil Ducar || East Pro Fight 9 || Košice, Slovakia || Judge decision || 3 || K-1
|-
|-  bgcolor="#CCFFCC"
| 2016-05-13 || Win ||align=left| Maxim Vorovski || No.1 Fight Show || Tallinn, Estonia || Judge decision || 3 || K-1
|-
|-  bgcolor="#CCFFCC"
| 2015-12-12 || Win ||align=left| Li Hao Tian || Wang Zhe Gui Lai || Nantong, China || Knockout || 2 || K-1
|-
|-  bgcolor="#CCFFCC"
| 2015-08-10 || Win ||align=left| Vladislav Koshel || Golden Bars Championship || Belgorod, Russia || Judge decision || 3 || Muay Thai
|-
|-  bgcolor="#CCFFCC"
| 2015-08-10 || Win ||align=left| Seku Bangura || Golden Bars Championship || Belgorod, Russia || Dissection || 2 || Muay Thai
|-
|-  bgcolor="#CCFFCC"
| 2015-08-22 || Win ||align=left| Liu Yuchun || Wu Lin Feng World Championship || Xiamen, China || Dissection || 1 || K-1
|-
|-  bgcolor="#CCFFCC"
| 2015-06-27 || Win ||align=left| Igor Lyapin || Plecho: Kick&Win || Kyiv, Ukraine || Judge decision || 3 || Low-Kick
|-
|-  bgcolor="#CCFFCC"
| 2015-06-27 || Win ||align=left| Nikolay Olyinyk || Plecho: Kick&Win || Kyiv, Ukraine || Judge decision || 3 || Low-Kick
|-
|-  bgcolor="#CCFFCC"
| 2015-02-28 || Win ||align=left| Nikita Zinchenko || Plecho: Kick&Win || Kyiv, Ukraine || Judge decision || 3 || Low-Kick
|-
|-  bgcolor="#CCFFCC"
| 2015-02-28 || Win ||align=left| Ivan Minenko || Plecho: Kick&Win || Kyiv, Ukraine || Judge decision || 3 || Low-Kick
|-
|-  bgcolor="#CCFFCC"
| 2013-06-01 || Win ||align=left| Miroslav Cingel || YoungBlood Profi Liga || Banska Bystrica, Slovakia || Judge decision || 3 || K-1
|-
|-  bgcolor="#FFBBBB"
| 2013-05-18 || Loss || align="left" | Artem Vakhitov || 'Alpha' Cup || Moscow, Russia || Judge decision || 5 || Muay Thai
|-
|-  bgcolor="#CCFFCC"
| 2012-09-29 || Win ||align=left| Vladimir Idranyi || President's Cup || Mariupol, Ukraine || Judge decision || 5 || Muay Thai
|-  bgcolor="#CCFFCC"
| 2011-11-12 || Win ||align=left| Dmitry Shakuta || Tatneft Cup 2011 Final || Kazan, Russia || Judge decision || 6 || K-1
|-
! style=background:white colspan=9 |
|-
|-  bgcolor="#CCFFCC"
| 2011-09-03 || Win ||align=left| Stanislav Zanevsky || President's Cup || Mariupol, Ukraine || 3 knockdowns || 3 || Muay Thai
|-
|-  bgcolor="#CCFFCC"
| 2011-07-23 || Win ||align=left| Alexander Stetsurenko || Tatneft Cup 2011 1/2 final || Kazan, Russia || Judge decision || 4 || K-1
|-
|-  bgcolor="#CCFFCC"
| 2011-06-10 || Win ||align=left| Dawid Kasperski ||  || Poland || Judge decision || 3 || K-1
|-
|-  bgcolor="#CCFFCC"
| 2011-05-28 || Win ||align=left| Jose Barradas || Tatneft Cup 2011 1/4 final || Kazan, Russia || Judge decision || 3 || K-1
|-
|-  bgcolor="#CCFFCC"
| 2011-02-18 || Win ||align=left| Errol Konning || Tatneft Cup 2011 1/8 final || Kazan, Russia || Judge decision || 4 || K-1
|-
! style=background:white colspan=9 |
|-  bgcolor="#CCFFCC"
| 2010-12-11 || Win ||align=left| Konstantin Tutu || King Of Kings Final || Chisinau, Moldova || Knockout || 4 || K-1
|-
|-  bgcolor="#CCFFCC"
| 2010-12-11 || Win ||align=left| Sebastian Horeica || King Of Kings 1/2 final || Chisinau, Moldova || Judge decision || 3 || K-1
|-
|-  bgcolor="#CCFFCC"
| 2010-12-11 || Win ||align=left| Sem Braan || King Of Kings 1/4 final || Chisinau, Moldova || 3 knockdowns || 2 || K-1
|-
|-  bgcolor="#CCFFCC"
| 2010-11-06 || Win ||align=left| Igor Ditrich ||  || Poland || Knockout || 2 || K-1
|-
|-  bgcolor="#CCFFCC"
| 2010-11-06 || Win ||align=left| Marcin Mencel ||  || Poland || Knockout || 1 || K-1
|-
|-  bgcolor="#CCFFCC"
| 2010-09-18 || Win ||align=left| Alexandr Kitichenko ||  || Zaporizhzhia, Ukraine || Judge decision || 3 || K-1
|-
|-  bgcolor="#CCFFCC"
| 2010-04-16 || Win ||align=left| Roman Mirzoev ||  || Yenakiieve, Ukraine || Judge decision || 3 || K-1
|-
|-  bgcolor="#CCFFCC"
| 2010-04-16 || Win ||align=left| Igor Kabanov ||  || Yenakiieve, Ukraine || Knockout || 1 || K-1
|-
! style=background:white colspan=9 |

|-
|-  bgcolor="#CCFFCC"
| 2008-07-18 || Win ||align=left| Oleg Shevchenko ||  || Sudak, Ukraine || Knockout || 3 || Wushu-Sanda
|-
|-  bgcolor="#CCFFCC"
| 2008-07-18 || Win ||align=left| Andrey Embalaev ||  || Sudak, Ukraine || Judge decision || 3 || Wushu-Sanda
|-
|-  bgcolor="#CCFFCC"
| 2008-07-18 || Win ||align=left| Ivan Skifov ||  || Sudak, Ukraine || Second's denial || 2 || Wushu-Sanda

|-
|-  bgcolor="#CCFFCC"
| 2008-04-18 || Win ||align=left| Eyup Kuscu ||  || Istanbul, Turkey || Knockout || 2 || K-1
|-
|-  bgcolor="#CCFFCC"
| 2008-03-16 || Win ||align=left| Vyacheslav Sherbakov ||  || Mariupol, Ukraine || 3 knockdowns || 2 || K-1
|-
|-  bgcolor="#FFBBBB"
| 2008-02-26 || Loss ||align=left| Sergey Lashenko || Honour Of Warrior  || Kharkiv, Ukraine || Judge decision || 4 || Kick-Jitsu
|-
|-  bgcolor="#CCFFCC"
| 2008-02-26 || Win ||align=left| Andrey Anikin || Honour Of Warrior  || Kharkiv, Ukraine || Judge decision || 3 || Kick-Jitsu
|-
|-  bgcolor="#CCFFCC"
| 2008-02-26 || Win ||align=left| Yuri Gorbenko || Honour Of Warrior  || Kharkiv, Ukraine || Judge decision || 3 || Kick-Jitsu
|-
|-  bgcolor="#CCFFCC"
| 2007-10-27 || Win ||align=left| Yaroslav Zakharov ||  || Mariupol, Ukraine || Judge decision || 5 || Muay Thai 
|-
|-  bgcolor="#FFBBBB"
| 2007-10-06 || Loss ||align=left| Anrey Osadchiy ||  || Morshyn, Ukraine || Judge decision || 3 || K-1
|-
|-  bgcolor="#CCFFCC"
| 2007-08-10 || Win ||align=left| Timur Bahramov ||  || Feodosiya, Ukraine || Judge decision || 3 || K-1 
|-
|-  bgcolor="#CCFFCC"
| 2007-07-07 || Win ||align=left| Slovak Fighter ||  || Brezno, Slovakia || Judge decision || 3 || K-1 
|-
|-
| colspan=9 | Legend:    

|-  style="background:#fbb;"
| 2012-09-11|| Loss ||align=left| Dzianis Hancharonak || 2012 IFMA World Championships, Semi Final || Saint Petersburg, Russia || Decision || 4 || 2:00
|-
! style=background:white colspan=9 |

|-  style="background:#cfc;"
| 2012-09-09 || Win ||align=left| Jafar Ahmadi  || 2012 IFMA World Championships, Quarter Finals || Saint Petersburg, Russia || Decision || 4 || 2:00

|-  style="background:#fbb;"
| 2012-05-23 || Loss ||align=left| Artem Vakhitov || 2012 IFMA European Championships -86 kg/189 lb, Final || Antalya, Turkey || Decision || 4 || 2:00
|-
! style=background:white colspan=9 |

|-  style="background:#cfc;"
| 2012-05-|| Win||align=left| Andrey Gerasimchuk || 2012 IFMA European Championships, Semi Final || Antalya, Turkey || Decision || 4 || 2:00

|-  style="background:#fbb;"
| 2011-09-25|| Loss||align=left| Alexandr Veghvatov|| 2011 IFMA World Championships, Semi Finals || Tashkent, Uzbekistan || Decision || 4 || 2:00
|-
! style=background:white colspan=9 |
|-  style="background:#cfc;"
| 2011-09-24|| Win ||align=left| Nubolat Senginov|| 2011 IFMA World Championships, Quarter Finals || Tashkent, Uzbekistan || KO || 2 || 

|-  style="background:#fbb;"
| 2011-04-00 || Loss ||align=left| Artem Vakhitov || 2011 IFMA European Championships -86 kg/189 lb, Semi Finals || Antalya, Turkey || Decision || 4 || 2:00
|-
! style=background:white colspan=9 |

|-  style="background:#cfc;"
| 2011-04-00 || Win ||align=left| Jordan Kolev || 2011 IFMA European Championships -86 kg/189 lb, Quarter Finals || Antalya, Turkey || Decision || 4 || 2:00

|-  style="background:#cfc;"
| 2010-12- || Win ||align=left| Andrey Gerasimchuk || 2010 I.F.M.A. World Muaythai Championships, Finals || Bangkok, Thailand ||Decision ||4 ||2:00
|-
! style=background:white colspan=9 |

|-  style="background:#cfc;"
| 2010-12- || Win||align=left| Javlon Nazarov || 2010 I.F.M.A. World Muaythai Championships, Semi Finals || Bangkok, Thailand || Decision ||4 ||2:00

|-  style="background:#cfc;"
| 2010-12- || Win||align=left| Adam Lazarevic|| 2010 I.F.M.A. World Muaythai Championships, Quarter Finals || Bangkok, Thailand || Decision ||4 ||2:00

|-  style="background:#cfc;"
| 2010-12- || Win||align=left| Suleiman Magomedov|| 2010 I.F.M.A. World Muaythai Championships, 1/8 Finals || Bangkok, Thailand || Decision ||4 ||2:00

|-  style="background:#cfc;"
| 2010-05-|| Win||align=left| Andrey Gerasimchuk || 2010 IFMA European Championships, Final || Italy || Decision || 4 || 2:00
|-
! style=background:white colspan=9 |

|-  style="background:#cfc;"
| 2010-05-|| Win||align=left| Aristodimo Angelo|| 2010 IFMA European Championships, Semi Final || Italy || Decision || 4 || 2:00

|-  style="background:#cfc;"
| 2010-05-|| Win||align=left| Thoday Toplak|| 2010 IFMA European Championships, Quarter Final || Italy || Doctor stoppage|| 1 || 

|-  style="background:#fbb;"
| 2009-12-||Loss ||align=left| Andrey Gerasimchuk|| 2009 IFMA World Championships, Semi Finals || Bangkok, Thailand || Decision || 4 || 
|-
! style=background:white colspan=9 |

|-  bgcolor="#CCFFCC"
| 2009-05-30 || Win ||align=left| Egypt Fighter || ISKA World Championship || Hurghada, Egypt || KO || 5 || 
|-
|-  bgcolor="#CCFFCC"
| 2009-05-29 || Win ||align=left| Patrice Ndiaye || ISKA World Championship || Hurghada, Egypt || KO || 3 || 
|-
| colspan=9 | Legend:

Mixed martial arts record

|-
|Loss
|align=center|2–2
|Artem Egorov
|Decision
|
|
|align=center|2
|align=center|
|Donetsk, Ukraine
|-
|Win
|align=center|2–1
|Roman Mirzoev
|Submission (choke)
|
|
|align=center|2
|align=center|
|Donetsk, Ukraine
|
|-
|Win
|align=center|1–1
|Denis Simkin
|Decision
|
|
|align=center|2
|align=center|
|Donetsk, Ukraine
|
|-
|Loss
|align=center|0–1
|Buson Skodric
|Submission (choke)
|
|
|align=center|1
|align=center|1:06
|Kosice, Slovakia
|

See also
 List of K-1 events
 List of K-1 champions
 List of male kickboxers

References

External links
 Federation of Combat Contact Martial Arts of Ukraine

Ukrainian male kickboxers
Middleweight kickboxers
Living people
Ukrainian Muay Thai practitioners
1986 births
Sportspeople from Mariupol